The General Legal Council is the body that regulates the Legal Profession in Ghana. It was set up in 1960 by an act of parliament, The Legal Profession Act, 1960 (Act 32). Its role was to oversee legal education and the legal profession in the country.

Members of the Council
The membership of the Council includes academics, judges and legal practitioners representing legal education, training and practice. The Chief Justice of Ghana currently in office is the chairperson for the council. It also includes the three most senior members of the Supreme Court of Ghana. It also includes the Attorney General of Ghana and his or her nominee. Also in the council are the President, Vice President and secretary of the Ghana Bar Association.

Functions
The council maintains licences lawyers to practice. It also enrolls new members to the Ghana Bar during the first week of every October. It has a Disciplinary Committee which is able to sanction and disbar legal practitioners in the country.

References

1960 in Ghana
Organizations established in 1960
Law of Ghana
Government of Ghana
Regulation in Ghana